Jeremy David Batty (born 15 May 1971) is an English former professional cricketer, who played for Yorkshire and Somerset as a right-handed batsman, and off spin bowler.

Batty made his Yorkshire debut in 1989, leaving the county in 1994 to play for Somerset until 1996. In 84 first-class matches he scored 1,149 runs at 15.95 with two fifties, and took 179 wickets at 41.56, with a career-best of 6 for 48. He appeared for Buckinghamshire in 2003 and 2004.

His brother, Gareth Batty, has also played first-class cricket and appeared for England.

Jeremy Batty resides in Oxfordshire with wife Sabina and their son.

References

External links

1971 births
Living people
Yorkshire cricketers
Buckinghamshire cricketers
Somerset cricketers
Cricketers from Bradford
English cricketers
Buckinghamshire cricket captains
Cheshire cricketers
Shropshire cricketers
English cricketers of 1969 to 2000
English cricketers of the 21st century